The Cinquantenaire Arcade is a memorial arcade in the centre of the Parc du Cinquantenaire/Jubelpark in Brussels, Belgium. The centrepiece is a monumental triple arch known as the Cinquantenaire Arch. It is topped by a bronze quadriga sculptural group with a female charioteer, representing the Province of Brabant personified raising the national flag.

This area is served by the metro stations Schuman and Merode on lines 1 and 5.

History
The Cinquantenaire Arcade was part of a project commissioned by the Belgian Government under the patronage of King Leopold II for the 1880 National Exhibition, commemorating the 50th anniversary of the Belgian Revolution. In 1880, only the bases of the memorial arch's columns were completed, and during the exhibition, the rest of the arch was constructed from wooden panels. In the following years, the monument's completion was the topic of a continuous battle between Leopold II and the Belgian Government, which did not want to spend the money required to complete it.

The original single arch of the 1880 exhibition was conceived by the architect Gédéon Bordiau, but upon his death in 1904, the arch's design was revised by the French architect Charles Girault, chosen by Leopold II. Girault designed a triple arch, but preserved Bordiau's idea of the quadriga. The foundation of the new arch was laid down on 4 January 1905, replacing Bordiau's temporary arch. The basic construction was completed with private funding in May of the same year and the arcade was inaugurated by Leopold II on 27 September 1905, just in time for the 75th anniversary of Belgian Independence.

The monument received protected status on 29 June 1984.

Description

Arch
The ceiling, whose arches are semi-circular, is made up of stone caissons, decorated for half of them with a laurel wreath, and for the rest with the acronym meaning "The King, and Law, and Liberty!", one of Belgium's official pledges. The monument's decoration and the sculptures which adorn it were entrusted to the most prominent artists of the time in a spirit of national exaltation.

Quadriga

The arch's bronze quadriga, entitled Brabant Raising the National Flag, was made by Thomas Vinçotte and the horses by Jules Lagae. The pedestal, facing the Avenue de Tervueren/Tervurenlaan, bears the inscription: "This monument was erected in 1905 for the glorification of the independence of Belgium", with the year shown in Roman numerals. A spiral staircase, now flanked by an elevator, provides access to the exhibition room located under the quadriga and to the two terraces located on either side of it.

Columns and sculptures
The columns echo the original layout of the Avenue de Tervueren, which was once divided into three roadways lined with a double row of trees. At the foot of the arch, a total of eight statues depicting personifications of Belgian Provinces can be found on either sidewall (Brabant being represented by the quadriga): Province of Hainaut and Province of Limburg by Albert Desenfans, Province of Antwerp and Province of Liège by Charles van der Stappen, Province of East Flanders and Province of West Flanders by Jef Lambeaux, and Province of Namur and Province of Luxembourg by Guillaume de Groot. Twelve spandrels are decorated with allegories of Arts and Industry.

Colonnade and frieze
The originally open colonnade was closed at the rear by a wall in 1905, which starting in 1912, was decorated with a  mosaic frieze with the theme The glorification of peaceful and heroic Belgium, by Jean Delville. He was then joined by several other artists. The mosaic decoration was completed in 1932.

Location and accessibility
The various buildings of the Cinquantenaire, of which the arch forms the centrepiece, host three museums; the Royal Military Museum, the Art & History Museum and Autoworld vintage car museum. In front of the arch lies a large esplanade cutting through the Cinquantenaire Park. The Temple of Human Passions by Victor Horta, a remainder from 1886, and the Great Mosque of Brussels from 1978, are located in the north-western corner of the park. The surrounding park esplanade is used for several purposes in the summer, such as military parades and drive-in movies. It is also the starting point for the 20 km of Brussels, an annual run with 30,000 participants.

Lines 1 and 5 of the Brussels Metro and the Belliard Tunnel from the Rue de la Loi/Wetstraat pass underneath the park, the latter partly in an open section in front of the arch. The nearest metro stations are Schuman to the west of the park, and Merode immediately to the east.

See also

 Neoclassical architecture in Belgium
 History of Brussels
 Culture of Belgium
 Belgium in "the long nineteenth century"

References

Notes

Bibliography
 

Triumphal arches in Belgium
Cinquantenaire
City of Brussels
Neoclassical architecture in Belgium
Buildings and structures completed in 1905
1905 establishments in Belgium